Bogdan Petrovich Gordeev (21 June 1894– 7 September 1914), also known as Bozhidar, was a Russian futurist poet of Ukrainian origin.

Bozhidar (sometimes transliterated Bojidar) is also a Bulgarian given name.

Biography and literary career 
Bogdan Petrovich Gordeev was born into the family of a professor of Veterinary Institute and a school teacher. 

He attended the Third Kharkiv Gymnasium, graduating with a gold medal in 1913. 

After graduating, Gordeev, strongly influenced by creations of Velemir Khlebnikov, took his pseudonym and became intimate with a literary group "Centrifuge", which was founded in the same year by Boris Pasternak, Sergey Bobrov and Nikolay Aseev. In the beginning of 1914, Bozhidar, Aseev and Grigory Petnikov founded publishing house Liren (Лирень). Later in that year, the only book of poems by Bozidar – “Tambourine” (in the spelling of the author, mixing the graphics of the Latin alphabet and Cyrillic alphabet – “Byben”), was published.

Bozhidar committed suicide by hanging on 7 September 1914 in a forest near Kharkiv, partially due to the beginning of World War I.

His prosody tractate and Byben's second issue were published posthumously. 

Bozhidar was also posthumously included in Khlebnikov's "Chairmen of the Globe" society by its founder: Khlebnikov wrote his name under "Martians' Trumpet" manifest in 1916.

See also 
 Russian Futurism

External links 
 Bozhidar's Verses
 Russian Humanitary Encyclopedia. Bozhidar
 Bozhidar's bio

1894 births
1914 suicides
Writers from Kharkiv
People from Kharkov Governorate
Russian male poets
Ukrainian poets in Russian
Suicides by hanging in Ukraine
20th-century Russian poets
20th-century Russian male writers
1914 deaths